Gard is a département located in southern France in the Languedoc-Roussillon region. It may also refer to:

Places

Places in France
Pont du Gard, a Roman aqueduct bridge
Vers-Pont-du-Gard, a commune in the Gard department
Rochefort-du-Gard, a commune in the Gard department
Saint-Jean-du-Gard, a commune in the Gard department
Castillon-du-Gard, a commune in the Gard department
Saint-Gilles-du-Gard, a commune in the Gard department
Saint-Bonnet-du-Gard, a commune in the Gard department
Saint-Mamert-du-Gard, a commune in the Gard department
Gard, alternate name for Gardon, French river

Places in Scandinavia
Enskede gård, community in Söderort, Stockholm, Sweden
Hässelby gård, suburban district west of Stockholm belonging to the Hässelby-Vällingby borough
Skarpnäcks gård, district (stadsdel) in Skarpnäck in Stockholm Municipality, Sweden 
Erichsens Gård, now part of Bornholms Museum
Grönvik gård, mansion in the village of Grönvik, Korsholm municipality in Western Finland 
Smådalarö Gård, inn located at Dalarö in Stockholm archipelago (Stockholm, Sweden)
Leangen Gård
Farm Gård, definition of every farm or larger country home in Denmark and Sweden.

Places in other countries
 Gard, a tributary of the river Jijia in Romania
 Gard (Slavic toponymy), Slavic toponym
 Gard, Illinois, unincorporated community, United States

People

Surname
Alex Gard (1898–1948), Russian cartoonist
Cătălin-Ionuț Gârd  (born 1981), Romanian tennis player
Charlie Gard (2016–2017), British infant; subject of parental rights and life support cases
George E. Gard (1843–1904), American police chief and sheriff
Jean-Paul Martin-du-Gard (1927–2017), French athlete
John Gard (born 1963), American politician
Léon Gard (1901–1979), French painter and art critic
Lewis Gard (born 1999), English footballer
Mike Gard (born 1952), Australian politician
Phil Gard (1947–1990), New Zealand rugby union player
Robert G. Gard Jr., American military strategist
Robert Gard (tenor), 1927–2021, Australian operatic tenor
Roger Martin du Gard (1881–1958), French author and winner of the 1937 Nobel Prize for Literature
Toby Gard (born 1972), English computer game character designer and consultant
Trevor Gard (born 1957), English cricketer
Warren Gard (1873–1929), American attorney, prosecutor, jurist and politician
William Du Gard (1606–1662), English schoolmaster and printer; see William Dugard

Given name
Gard Kvale (born 1984), Norwegian swimmer
Gard Agdi, Norse mythological figure; a son of Nór

Other
Assuranceforeningen Gard, marine insurance company
Genetic and Rare Diseases Information Center, a program of the NIH National Center for Advancing Translational Sciences
Gard_model for prebiotic evolution.

See also
Gord (disambiguation)
Garde (disambiguation)
Gart (disambiguation)
Grad (disambiguation)
Dugard (disambiguation)
Guard (disambiguation)